Rajjo is an Indian Hindi-language television drama series that premiered on 22 August 2022 on StarPlus and digitally streams on Disney+ Hotstar. The show is produced by Bits N Bots Media and stars Celesti Bairagey, Rajveer Singh and Gungun Uprari in the titular roles. It is an official Hindi remake of Star Jalsha’s Aalta Phoring.

Premise
The show revolves around the trials and tests of an aspiring athlete Rajjo from Uttarakhand. Her mother, Manorama, has a dark past, and hence is against Rajjo’s dreams of turning an athlete. After getting separated by her mother in Kedarnath flood and crossing-paths with a fertilizer businessman Arjun, how will Rajjo react to the past, and manage to win her dreams in the present?

Cast

Main
 Celesti Bairagey as Rajjo Thakur (née Dhaki) – An aspiring athlete; Manorama and Pushkar's daughter; Kalindi, Niharika and Bunty's half-sister; Mukund, Sagar and Pankhuri's cousin; Vicky's ex-fiancé; Arjun's wife
 Rajveer Singh as Arjun Singh Thakur – A fertilizer businessman; Madhumalti and Pratap's younger son; Chirag's younger brother; Mukund, Rocky, Sagar and Pankhuri's cousin; Urvashi's ex-fiancé; Rajjo's husband
 Gungun Uprari as Manorama "Manno" Dhaki – A former athlete; Pushkar's ex-lover; Rajjo's mother

Recurring
 Pakkhi Hegde as Madhumalti Pratap Thakur – Pratap's wife; Chirag and Arjun's mother; Rocky's aunt; Siya's grandmother
 Surjit Saha as Bunty Chaudhary – Kavita and Pushkar's son; Kalindi and Niharika's brother; Rajjo's half-brother; Mukund, Sagar and Pankhudi's cousin
 Siddharth Vasudev as Pushkar Chaudhary – Jhilmil's elder brother; Manorama's ex-lover; Kavita's husband; Kalindi, Niharika, Bunty and Rajjo's father; Siya's grandfather
 Kajal Sharma as Niharika Chaudhary – Pushkar and Kavita's younger daughter; Kalindi and Bunty's sister; Rajjo's half-sister
 Avinash Sahijwani as Pratap Singh Thakur – Keshav's elder son; Kartik's brother; Madhumalti's husband; Chirag and Arjun's father; Siya's grandfather
 Jaya Binju as Kavita Chaudhary – Pushkar's wife; Kalindi, Niharika and Bunty's mother; Rajjo's step-mother; Siya's grandmother
 Maleeka Ghai as Jhilmil Thakur (née Chaudhary) – Pushkar's sister; Kartik's wife; Mukund, Sagar and Pankhuri's mother
 Premchand Singh as Kartik Singh Thakur – Keshav's younger son; Pratap's brother; Jhilmil's husband; Mukund, Sagar and Pankhuri's father
 Utkarsh Gupta as Chirag Singh Thakur – Madhumalti and Pratap's elder son; Arjun's brother; Mukund, Rocky, Sagar and Pankhuri's cousin; Kalindi's husband; Siya's father
 Divyangana Jain as Kalindi Thakur (née Chaudhary) – Kavita and Pushkar's elder daughter; Niharika and Bunty's sister; Rajjo's half-sister; Mukund, Sagar and Pankhudi's cousin; Chirag's wife; Siya's mother; Rocky's lover
 Aayushi Bhave Tilak as Urvashi – Dheeraj's daughter; Arjun's ex-fiancée
 Ankit Bhardwaj as Mukund Singh Thakur – Jhilmil and Kartik's elder son; Sagar and Pankhuri's brother; Chirag, Arjun, Kalindi, Niharika, Bunty and Rajjo's cousin; Swara's husband
 Minoli Nandwana as Swara Thakur – Mukund's wife
 Vedant Sharan as Shesh - Rajjo’s one sided lover
 Itika Kabra as Siya Thakur – Kalindi and Chirag's daughter
 Niel Satpuda as Sagar Singh Thakur – Jhilmil and Kartik's younger son; Mukund and Pankhuri's brother; Chirag, Arjun, Kalindi, Niharika, Bunty and Rajjo's cousin
 Roselyn D'Souza as Pankhuri Thakur – Jhilmil and Kartik's daughter; Mukund and Sagar's sister; Chirag, Arjun, Kalindi, Niharika, Bunty and Rajjo's cousin
 Ravi Jhankal as Keshav Singh Thakur – Pratap and Kartik's father; Chirag, Mukund, Arjun, Sagar and Pankhuri's grandfather; Siya's great-grandfather
 Pratham Kunwar as Rocky – Madhumalti's nephew; Chirag and Arjun's cousin; Kalindi's lover
 Ankit Narang as Vicky – Rajjo's ex-fiancée
 Suraj Bharadwaj as Bharat
 Kalp Shah
 Sharanpreet Matharoo
 Harsh Chatrath as Dheeraj – Urvashi's father
 Kushagre Dua as Naman Singh Thakur – Anil and Shobha's son; Arjun's cousin

Production

Broadcast
The show suffered a change in time slot from 4 January 2023 onwards. Speaking on the same, actor Rajveer Singh said, "At the end of the day, it is the channel's decision. Our show is moving to that slot and I think we will do good in that slot, too. In the 7 pm slot, we have been consistent and so I don't feel that our show was moved due to low ratings. In fact, in the last two weeks, our ratings have improved. Maybe, the channel wants to make the 6.30 slot more engaging for viewers."

Casting
Celesti Bairagey was chosen after she released a video of herself in a Gangubai Kathiawadi clip, which went viral.

Post Bairagey, Rajveer Singh and Gungun Uprari too were signed along with other actors to join the cast.

Release 
The first promo of Rajjo was released in July 2022. It replaced Kabhi Kabhie Ittefaq Sey from 22 August 2022.

Title
The show was initially promoted with the title Udti Ka Naam Rajjo, before it was modified to Rajjo.

References

External links
 Rajjo on Disney+ Hotstar

Hindi-language television shows
Indian television soap operas
StarPlus original programming
Indian drama television series
Indian romance television series
2022 Indian television series debuts
2023 Indian television series endings